Songs for Tsunami Relief: Austin to South Asia is an album by American country and western musician Willie Nelson.  It was released on April 12, 2005, by the Lost Highway label. The album was recorded live in Austin, Texas, and made for the people of the 2004 tsunami.

Track listing 
 Love Be Heard
 Mary
 Farther Along/All Just to Get to You
 Boxcars
 Everybody Loves Me
 Break This Time
 My Mathematical Mind
 Everything Hits at Once
 What I Deserve
 Travelin' Soldier
 What Would Willie Do?
 Living in the Promiseland
 Whiskey River
 Still Is Still Moving to Me
 Blue Eyes Crying in the Rain
 The Great Divide
 Mamas Don't Let Your Babies Grow Up to Be Cowboys
 Angel Flying Too Close to the Ground

Chart performance

External links
 Willie Nelson's Official Website
 Lost Highway Records

2005 live albums
Willie Nelson live albums
Lost Highway Records live albums
Charity albums